MNE, mne or MnE may mean:

 Ministry of Foreign Affairs (Portugal) (Ministério dos Negócios Estrangeiros), the Portuguese foreign affairs ministry
 MNE, the international vehicle registration code and ISO 3166-1 alpha-3 country code for Montenegro
 MNE, the National Rail station code for Manea railway station, Fenland, Cambridgeshire, England
 mne, the ISO 639-2 code for the Naba language
 Modern English (MnE), the form of the language spoken from roughly 1550 to the present
 Multinational enterprise, a multinational corporation

See also
 Matters of Environmental Significance under the EPBC Act in Australia, known as MNES